A Lingual plate is a type of mandibular major connector that is used in a removable partial denture in the field of dentistry. It is a type of major connector that covers the lingual gingival tissues. It also prevents forces from being directed facially. Once fabricated, adding teeth to this type of major connector is easier than the lingual bar.

Indications

 Depth of lingual vestibule is less than 7mm
 Additional loss of teeth is anticipated
 Presence of a torus mandibularis
 All posterior teeth are to be replaced bilaterally

Contraindications

 Higher food impaction
 More tissue contact
 Higher plaque accumulation

It is important to note that a lingual bar would be used in cases that are completely opposite to indications mentioned above.

See also
 Palatal strap

References

Dentistry
Prosthodontology